Häagen-Dazs is an American ice cream brand, established by Reuben and Rose Mattus in The Bronx, New York, in 1960. Starting with only three flavors: vanilla, chocolate, and coffee, the company opened its first retail store in Brooklyn, New York, on November 15, 1976. The company operates worldwide and also produces ice cream bars, ice cream cakes, sorbet, frozen yogurt, and gelato.

History

Häagen-Dazs's founder Reuben Mattus was born in Poland in 1912 to Jewish parents. His father died during the First World War, and his widowed mother migrated to New York City with her two children in 1921. They joined an uncle who was in the Italian lemon-ice business in Brooklyn. By the late 1920s, the family began making ice pops, and by 1929, chocolate-covered ice cream bars and sandwiches under the name Senator Frozen Products on Southern Boulevard in the South Bronx, delivering them with a horse-drawn wagon to neighborhood stores in the Bronx.

The Senator Frozen Products company was profitable, but by the 1950s the large mass-producers of ice cream started a price war leading to his decision to make a heavy kind of high-end ice cream. In 1959, he decided to form a new ice cream company with what he thought to be a Danish-sounding name, Häagen-Dazs, as a tribute to Denmark's alleged exemplary treatment of Jews during World War II, a move known in the marketing industry as foreign branding. Rose Mattus would dress up in fancy clothing to distribute free samples, giving the ice cream an air of sophistication and class.

The Pillsbury Company bought Häagen-Dazs in 1983. In 1999, Pillsbury and Nestlé merged their U.S. and Canadian ice cream operations into a joint venture called Ice Cream Partners.  General Mills, in turn, bought Pillsbury in 2001 and succeeded to its interest in the joint venture. That same year, Nestlé exercised its contractual right to buy out General Mills' interest in Ice Cream Partners, which included the right to a 99-year license for the Häagen-Dazs brand, until 2100. Since then, pursuant to that license, the Dreyer's subsidiary of Nestlé has produced and marketed Häagen-Dazs products in the United States and Canada. In December 2019, Nestlé sold Dreyer's along with its rights in the Häagen-Dazs brand to Froneri, a joint venture set up by Nestlé and PAI Partners in 2016.

Origin of brand name
Reuben Mattus invented the phrase "Häagen-Dazs" in a quest for a brand name that he claimed was Danish-sounding; however, the company's pronunciation of the name ignores the letters "ä" and "z" and letters like "ä" or digraphs like "zs" do not exist in Danish. According to Mattus, it was a tribute to Denmark's exemplary treatment of its Jews during the Second World War, and included an outline map of Denmark on early labels. Mattus felt that Denmark was also known for its dairy products and had a positive image in the United States. His daughter Doris Hurley reported in the 1996 PBS documentary An Ice Cream Show that her father sat at the kitchen table for hours saying nonsensical words until he came up with a combination he liked. The reason he chose this method was so that the name would be unique and original.

Conflict with Frusen Glädjé
In 1980, Häagen-Dazs unsuccessfully sued Frusen Glädjé, an American ice cream maker founded that year, for using foreign branding strategies. The phrase frusen glädje—without the acute accent—is Swedish for "frozen delight". In 1985, Frusen Glädjé was sold to Kraft General Foods. A Kraft spokeswoman stated that Kraft sold its Frusen Glädjé license to the Unilever corporation in 1993, but a spokesman for Unilever claimed that Frusen Glädjé was not part of the deal. The brand has since been discontinued.

Nörgen Vaaz
A similar brand of premium ice cream named Nörgen Vaaz has been marketed, principally in southeast Australia, since at latest the 1980s. Häagen-Dazs does not appear to have challenged the Nörgen Vaaz brand name, perhaps due to their lack of success against Frusen Glädjé.

Products

Häagen-Dazs ice cream comes in several traditional flavors as well as several esoteric flavors that are specific to the brand, such as Vanilla Swiss Almond and Bananas Foster. It is marketed as a "super-premium" brand: it is quite dense (very little air is mixed in during manufacture), uses no emulsifiers or stabilizers other than egg yolks, and has a high butterfat content. It is sold both in grocery stores and in dedicated retail outlets serving ice cream cones, sundaes, and so on.

Since 1992, most of the world's Häagen-Dazs products have been manufactured at a plant in Tilloy-lès-Mofflaines, France that is now controlled by General Mills. In the United States and Canada, Häagen-Dazs is licensed to and produced by Froneri. Häagen-Dazs entered the Japanese market in 1984 by forming a joint venture with Suntory and Takanashi Milk, which has produced their products there ever since.

Notes

See also 
 List of ice cream parlor chains
 Baskin-Robbins
 Ben & Jerry's

References

External links

Official website

Companies based in Oakland, California
Froneri
General Mills brands
Ice cream brands
Ice cream parlors
Products introduced in 1960
Restaurants established in 1976
Food and drink companies established in 1960
1960 establishments in New York City